Zerovalent iron (ZVI) is jargon that describes forms of iron metal used for Groundwater remediation. ZVI serves as a reducing agent.

ZVI operates by electron transfer from Fe0 to the pollutant. For organochlorine pollutants, Fe2+ and Cl− are produced.

Type of metal

Bulk Fe. Cast iron, consisting of scrap iron of construction grade, has been used as a reactive material for permeable reactive barriers for groundwater remediation. Reactions are generally believed to occur on the Fe (oxide) surface; however, graphite inclusions have been shown can also serve as a reaction sites.
Nanoscale Fe. In addition to using macroscale iron in PRBs, nanoparticles (1-100 nm diameter)  of zerovalent iron (nZVI) are effective.
Zn. Zinc has showed much higher reactivity toward pentachlorophenol than iron. This indicates that zinc may be used as a replacement for ZVI in dechlorinating chlorinated phenols. Chlorinated phenols are sequentially dechlorinated and thus less chlorinated phenols have been identified as a reduction product.

Type of contaminants treated
Cadmium (Cd2+) is converted to immobile Cd metal.
Chloramines are effectively reduced by ZVI.
nitrate reduction by iron powder is observed only at pH≤4. Ammonia is the end product. Using nanoscale iron N2 gas is the product.
Nitrated aromatics are reduced by bulk iron.
Chlorinated pesticides such as DDT, DDD, and DDE. The rates of dechlorination are enhanced by the surfactant (Triton X-114).

Further reading
Tratnyek, P. G.; M. M. Scherer; T. J. Johnson; Matheson, L.J. (2003). Permeable reactive barriers of iron and other zerovalent metals. In: Tarr M. A. (ed.), Chemical Degradation Methods for Wastes and Pollutants; Environmental and Industrial Applications. Environmental Science and Pollution Control, Marcel Dekker, New York, pp 371–421.

Notes

Environmental chemistry